Otevan is a village in the Metsadzor Municipality of the Aragatsotn Province of Armenia. The village is home to a 12th-century ruined Armenian church as well as the ruins of a fortress and is mostly populated by Yezidis.

See also 

Genocide of Yazidis by ISIL
Yazidis in Armenia

References

Report of the results of the 2001 Armenian Census
Kiesling, Rediscovering Armenia, p. 18, available online at the US embassy to Armenia's website

Populated places in Aragatsotn Province
Yazidi populated places in Armenia